The Aichi E10A was a Japanese night reconnaissance flying boat of the 1930s.  A single-engined biplane, 15 were built for the Imperial Japanese Navy as the Type 96 Night Reconnaissance Seaplane, serving from 1936 but were retired in 1941 before the Attack on Pearl Harbor.

Development and design
In 1934, based on experience of testing the Experimental 6-Shi Night Reconnaissance Flying boat, the Imperial Japanese Navy drew up a specification for a new night reconnaissance aircraft, intended to shadow enemy fleets during the cover of darkness, with orders being placed with Aichi and with Kawanishi.

Aichi's design, with the company designation AB-12, was a single-engined biplane flying boat of all-metal construction.  Its two-bay wings folded rearwards to save space on board ship, while its crew of three were accommodated in an enclosed cabin. It was powered by a pusher water-cooled Aichi Type 91 engine, driving a four-blade wooden propeller.

The first prototype flew in December 1934, and when tested proved to have superior stability to the competing Kawanishi E10K, and so was ordered into production.

Operational history
The AB-12 entered service in August 1936 with the Japanese Navy as the Type 96 Night Reconnaissance Seaplane, with the short designation E10A.  Fifteen aircraft were built, remaining in service until 1941, being phased out before the Japanese Attack on Pearl Harbor. Despite this, it was assigned the Allied code name Hank.

Specifications (E10A)

See also

References

Francillon, R.J. Japanese Aircraft of the Pacific War. London:Putnam, 1970. .
Mikesh, Robert and Abe, Shorzoe. Japanese Aircraft 1910-1941. London:Putnam, 1990. .

External links

Aichi E10A

E10A
1930s Japanese military reconnaissance aircraft
Flying boats
Biplanes
Single-engined pusher aircraft
Aircraft first flown in 1934